The 1905 Arkansas Cardinals football team represented the University of Arkansas during the 1905 college football season. In their second and final season under head coach Ancil D. Brown, the Razorbacks compiled a 2–6 record and were outscored by their opponents by a combined total of 50 to 32.

At the outset, the University of Arkansas being known as the "Arkansas Cardinals" is in all likelihood a misnomer. The "cardinal" referred to the color cardinal and not the red bird. Moreover, as early as the first game of the 1905 season, news media reports specifically refer to the University of Arkansas football team as the "Razorbacks", pre-dating the University of Arkansas' official statement regarding how the University of Arkansas became the Razorbacks.

Schedule

References

Arkansas
Arkansas Razorbacks football seasons
Arkansas Cardinals football